Ian Adamson (born August 29, 1964) is a former competitive adventure racer, television professional and president of World Obstacle, the Fédération Internationale de Sports d’Obstacles (FISO).

Competition 
Adamson started competing in middle distance running, road cycling, cross country and swimming at school. While at university he focused on canoe and kayak, winning the Australian Universities Canoe Championship in C2 Wild Water in 1988, and has four Guinness World Records for the longest distance paddled in 24 hours (1997, 2004), Highest Altitude Obstacle Course Race (2021) and Highest Altitude Fitness Class (2021.)

Career
Adamson is an eleven-time world champion adventure racer, featured on television shows including the Eco-Challenge, Primal Quest, Raid Gauloises, Men's Journal Adventure Team and X-Games that aired on Outdoor Life Network, ESPN, Discovery Channel, USA Network and MTV from 1995 - 2006. He was a founding member of Team Nike ACG/Balance Bar

Professional life 
Adamson worked at Newton Running Company from 2007 to 2014 as Director of Product Development, and later Director of Medical & Education  and previously in an advisory capacity as a sponsored athlete for  GU, Giant Bikes, Nike (2002-2007.) He is currently president of World Obstacle, the Fédération Internationale de Sports d’Obstacles, the world governing body for Ninja Warrior, Obstacle Course Racing and adventure racing, and is working toward achieving Olympic recognition for the sport.

Adamson is also a writer, having authored Runner's World Guide to Adventure Racing and as a contributor to Adventure Racing the Ultimate Guide, the Complete Guide to Adventure Racing, The Thrill of Victory, The Agony of my Feet, print interviews, appearances and articles. He works as a legal forensic expert at Robson Forensic focusing on outdoor and adventure cases.

Filmography 
 2016 American Tarzan, Senior Race Coordinator, Discovery Channel
 2015 Down East Kayak, Talent, NBC Sports
 2015 Nature Island Challenge 3.0, Host, Outside Television
 2015 The Raft, Logistics Producer (6 episodes), National Geographic Channel
 2006 Primal Quest, Moab Utah, Cast, NBC Sports
 2004 Primal Quest, San Juan Islands, Cast, CBS
 2003 Primal Quest, Lake Tahoe, Cast, CBS
 2002 Eco-Challenge Fiji, Cast, USA Network
 2002 Primal Quest, Telluride, Cast, Outdoor Life Network
 2001 Eco-Challenge New Zealand, Cast, USA Network
 2001 World Championship Adventure Race Switzerland, Cast, Discovery Channel
 2001 Men's Journal Adventure Classics (3 episodes), Executive Producer/Cast, Outdoor Life Network
 2000 Eco-Challenge, Borneo, Cast, Discovery Channel
 2000 Raid Gaulioses, Race Across the Himalayas, Cast, Outdoor Life Network
 1999 Eco-Challenge, Argentina, Cast, Discovery Channel
 1998 Raid Gauloises, Race Across Ecuador, Cast, Outdoor Life Network
 1998 Mild Seven Outdoor Quest China, Cast
 1997 X-Games III, San Diego, Cast, ESPN
 1997 Eco-Challenge Australia, Cast, Discovery Channel
 1997 Mild Seven Outdoor Quest, China, Cast
 1996 X-Games II, ESPN
 1996 Eco-Challenge British Columbia, Discovery Channel
 1995 X-Games I, Eco-Challenge Maine, ESPN
 1995 Eco-Challenge Utah, MTV

Awards 
 2006 Men's Journal Adventurer of the year
 2005 Adventure Race Team of the Year
 2004 Adventure Race Team of the Year
 2002 RailRider Adventurer of the year

Works 
 Author: Runner's World Guide to Adventure Racing

References

External links
 Website
 

American male triathletes
1964 births
Living people
Sports commentators
Sportspeople from Boulder, Colorado
People from Davis, California
Davis Senior High School (California) alumni
Triathlon coaches